Nina Matejić (Serbian Cyrillic: Нине Матејић; born 8 February 2005) is a Serbian football forward who plays for Serbian Women's Super League club ŽFK Crvena zvezda and the Serbia women's national football team.

Club career
As a youth player Matejić was scouted by Bayern Munich. She performed well in a training spell with the German team, but they were not allowed to sign her until she was 18 years old. She joined ŽFK Požarevac of the Serbian Women's Super League in 2020 and was named "Player of the half-Season" in January 2021 after she scored 11 of her team's 16 league goals. In the summer of 2022 she joined ŽFK Crvena zvezda, commonly known as Red Star Belgrade.

International career
Matejić was called into the senior Serbia women's national football team for the first time for the 2021 Turkish Women's Cup.

She scored after three minutes in the opening 2023 FIFA Women's World Cup qualifying match against Germany in Chemnitz on 21 September 2021, but Serbia were beaten 5–1.

In October 2021, Matejić scored again as a Serbia team depleted by injuries and COVID-19 lost their next qualifier 2–1 to Portugal at Estádio do Bonfim in Setúbal.

International goals

References

External links
 

2005 births
Living people
Serbian women's footballers
Serbia women's international footballers
Women's association football forwards